Salih Pasha may refer to:

 Nevesinli Salih Pasha (died 1647), Ottoman grand vizier (1645–47)
 Kayserili Hacı Salih Pasha (died 1801 or 1802), Ottoman governor of Bosnia, Egypt, Diyarbekir, and Trabzon
 Salih Hulusi Pasha (1864–1939), Ottoman grand vizier (1920), one of the last

See also
 Salih (name)
 Pasha (title)